The Cyclops (Le Cyclope in French) is a painting by Odilon Redon that depicts the myth of the love of Polyphemus for the naiad Galatea. It was painted in oils on board, then mounted on wood, and is now in the Kröller-Müller Museum in the Netherlands. The painting has been variously dated between 1898 and 1914.

The painting
Galatea is shown asleep on the lower right, her naked body blending into the flowery hill slope. In the upper half of the painting, the head and shoulders of Polyphemus tower above a mountain ridge as he turns his one eye in the naiad's direction.  It appears Polyphemus has hidden himself from the nymph behind the rocky terrain, too shy to directly confront her "helpless" form.  Although the name given the painting refers to the figure of Classical myth, the subject may also carry overtones of the one-eyed giants that populate the folklore of the Aquitaine region where Redon grew up.

Notes

Further reading
Hauptman, Jodi. Beyond the Visible: The Art of Odilon Redon. New York: The Museum of Modern Art, 2005. 

1898 paintings
Paintings depicting Greek myths
Symbolist paintings
French Symbolist painters
Collections of the Kröller-Müller Museum